Silence: The Whispered World 2 is the sequel to The Whispered World, and is also a point-and-click adventure game. It was developed by Daedalic Entertainment. It was released on November 15, 2016. It came out for PS4, PC, Xbox One, macOS and Linux.

Gameplay
Silence is controlled via a point-and-click interface.

Plot
It follows a young girl, Renie, who is lost in a magical realm between life and death. Her older brother Noah then sets out to rescue her.

Development
Silence was developed by Daedalic Entertainment, creator of the original Whispered World.

Reception

Domestic

International

It received 75/100 as a score on Metacritic, out of 29 critics.

GameSpot said it was a "quiet puzzler," and liked it. It got 7 out of 10 from GameSpot, which really praised the hand-painted backdrops and interactivity. The review did criticize that there were not many challenging puzzles, and that some neat characters were removed from the game too quickly. Kotaku also thought it was pretty and had nice characters. It also thought the puzzles were more streamlined and intuitive than the one before.

See also
The Book of Unwritten Tales 2

References

 RPS review
 AG review
 GRY-online review
 GameZebo review
 HCG review
 GameStar review

External links
 

2016 video games
Daedalic Entertainment games
Linux games
MacOS games
Nintendo Switch games
PlayStation 4 games
Point-and-click adventure games
Single-player video games
Windows games
Xbox One games
Xbox Play Anywhere games